Communist and Marxist ideologies generally allow state-provided abortion, although there is no consensus among Communist parties and governments about how far into the pregnancy abortion should be allowed.

Marxist Feminist views on abortion 

Marxist feminists support the right of free access to abortion for women from all classes.

Communist parties views on abortion 
In the Western world, the majority of the supporters of Communism also support abortion on request.

 The Communist Party USA supports the right of abortion and social services to provide access to it, arguing that unplanned pregnancy is prejudiced against poor women.
 The Communist Party of Canada criticized Donald Trump's anti-abortion policies, including his defunding of the pro-choice organization Planned Parenthood.
 The Brazilian Communist Party supports abortion on request, criticizing relationships between state and religion leading to its ban.

Communist countries

People's Republic of China 

Abortion in China is generally legal and accessible. Abortions are widely accepted socially and are available to all women through China's family planning programme, public hospitals, private hospitals, and clinics nationwide.

In 2021, China's State Council as well as the non-governmental organization responsible for family planning announced policy guidelines with the goal of reducing non-medically necessary abortions, including by increasing women's access to pre-pregnancy healthcare services.

To reduce the high number of sex-selective abortions, the Chinese government banned prenatal sex discernment.

Cuba 
The Cuban government decriminalized abortion in 1965. Women have free access to abortion in Cuba, helping to make it a regional front-runner in women's rights according to Reuters. Late-term abortions require a formal evaluation that is conducted by a committee of gynecologists and a psychologist.

North Korea 
The Penal Code from 1950 states that abortion is allowed for "important reasons" up to the seventh week of pregnancy, but that anyone who performs an abortion for no important reason is subject to up to three years' imprisonment. Broad interpretation of the phrase "important reasons" meant that abortion was available virtually upon request, and, reportedly, abortion services could be provided free of charge at provincial hospitals.

As of the UN's 2017 World Population Policies report, abortion is available in North Korea for all reasons, including upon request, and without gestational limits.

Vietnam 
The Law of Protection of People's Health, passed in 1989, states that: "Women have the right to have an abortion, to receive gynecological diagnosis and treatment, health check-up during pregnancy, and medical service when giving birth at health facilities."

Vietnam has also adopted policies to ban and prevent sex-selective abortions, among other countries such as Nepal.

Laos 
Laos has the strictest limitations on legal abortions among current Marxist–Leninist countries. At this time, abortion is only allowed in order to save the life of the mother.

Former Communist 
Many historical Communist countries, primarily in Europe, chose to allow abortion on request or due to socioeconomic factors. The Soviet Union under Stalin and Romania under Ceaușescu, however, took action to further limit abortions, and other Communist countries retained prohibitive laws against them.

Soviet Union 
In 1920, Soviet Russia became the first modern country to legalize abortion. In 1933, during the Stalin era, views changed. In the Congress of Kiev in 1932, abortion was criticized for decreasing the country's birth rate. Abortion was finally banned in 1933. In her book, "Sexual Politics", the radical feminist Kate Millett criticized the Soviet regime for failing to support the social rights of women and homosexual people. The number of officially recorded abortions dropped sharply from 1.9 million in 1935 to 570,000 in 1937, but began to climb just two years later, reaching 755,000 in 1939. On November 23, 1955, the Presidium of the Supreme Soviet, under Nikita Khrushchev, legalized abortion.

Poland 
Debates surrounding abortion started around 1929 in Poland. By 1932, abortion was considered legal if the pregnancy was a result of a crime where a woman’s health was at risk. Despite the protests of the Catholic Church, abortion in Poland was allowed on social grounds in 1956. Subsequently, it was fully allowed in 1959 to protect the life and morality of women that had unsafe abortions. The abortions were provided by public hospitals.

Hungary 
Prior to 1953, abortion was only allowed to save the mother's life. In 1953 and 1956, the laws legalized abortion until 12 weeks of pregnancy, in cases of socioeconomic factors. In 1973, although abortion was still allowed for social reasons, the list of other acceptable reasons was reduced.

East Germany 
In East Germany, women under 16 years of age, women over 40, and mothers with at least four children were given the right to abortion after applying to a state commission. Abortion was fully legalized by parliament in 1972.

Romania 
Before 1966, Romania had the most progressive laws of abortion in Europe. However, after the rise of power of Nicolae Ceaușescu, Decree 770 only allowed abortion to save the life of the mother. It was also allowed for women over 45 years old or with four or more children. (In 1974, the age was lowered to 40; in 1986, it was raised again to 45.) The goal of the ban was a larger population that could drive a larger workforce and consumer-led growth, in order to achieve economic independence from the Soviet Union. Over the span of these 23 years, more than 2 million unwanted children, were born and at least 10,000 women died as a result. The 770 Decree was one of the first laws to be repealed right after Ceaușescu's trial and execution on the 25th of December, 1989; more than 1 million abortions were performed the year after, more than three times the number of children born that year.

Czechoslovakia 
An abortion law passed in 1957 allowed termination for, both medical (forming 10% of the cases) and other reasons (the remaining 90%). The law was changed after 1957. The birth ratio decreased, falling below number of abortions.

Bulgaria 
Abortion was legalized on April 27, 1956. It was only allowed once every 6 months, and no later than the 12th week of pregnancy except for health reasons. To increase the birth rate, the government restricted abortion for certain women in February 1968 by the Decree 188, which discouraged childless women and women with one or two children from having an abortion (although they could possibly have the procedure if they persisted). Only women with three or more children, or women over 45 years ago, had the right to an abortion on request. The time ceiling was also lowered to 10 weeks. In April 1973, women with just one child lost the right to abortion except in cases of rape, incest, medical emergency, if the woman was an unmarried person under the age of 18 with no living children, or if she was over 45 years old with a living child. By 1974, unmarried women were allowed to get an abortion.

Yugoslavia 
Abortion was legalized in 1952. Article 191 of the federal constitution states that "it is a human right to decide on the birth of children". All the republics of Yugoslavia passed laws between 1977 and 1979 that regulated abortion; in Croatia, for example, abortion was only allowed until 10 weeks of pregnancy, but in Slovenia, it was allowed after the 10 weeks on request.

Albania 
During Enver Hoxha's rule, abortion was only legally allowed to save mother's life, but in practice could be obtained for any reason. The punishment for a woman who had an abortion was social reprimand by re-education through work. By 1989, abortion was officially legalized in cases of rape, incest, and for women under 16 years old, among other reasons.

Mongolia 
Induced abortion in socialist Mongolia was allowed since 1940 to preserve the mother's health, officially recorded in the penal code on July 6, 1960.  In 1986, the amendment authorized medical authorities to decide when to perform an abortion, and abortion was fully legalized in 1989.

Kampuchea 
According to the French penal code, abortion in Kampuchea was prohibited, but the general criminal law principles of necessity allowed abortion to save mother's life. During the period of extended turmoil under the Communist Regime, the laws about abortion were unclear, and untrained health workers accepted requests for abortions.

Afghanistan 
The criminal code from 7 October 1976 only allowed abortion to save the mother's life. The socialist government never changed this law.

South Yemen 
The law of South Yemen only allowed abortion to save the mother's life, as with North Yemen.

Angola 
Abortion remained prohibited in Angola, and was only allowed in order to save the mother's life.

Mozambique 
Before 1981, abortion was only allowed to save the mother's life. In 1981, abortion was allowed in case of contraceptive failure. Since then, the law has been interpreted very liberally in some hospitals, leading them to accept women who sign a written statement requesting the abortion.

Benin 
The civil code from 8 February 1973 only allowed abortion to save the mother's life, which the socialist government never changed.

People's Republic of the Congo 
Abortion was prohibited, but the general principles of criminal law allowed abortions on grounds of medical necessity, with reports suggesting they were also permitted for less immediately dangerous complications.

Ethiopia 
Abortion was only allowed to “save the pregnant woman from the grave and permanent danger to life or health that is impossible to avert in any other way”. Although the code does not accept broad health, judicial or socio-economic grounds, and doesn't specify whether a threat to health includes both physical and mental health, it does consider a “grave state of physical or mental distress, especially following rape or incest, or because of extreme poverty” a mitigating circumstance in sentencing.

Somalia 
Since December 16, 1962, abortion was prohibited. The socialist regime never changed the law, but the criminal law's general principles of necessity allowed for an abortion to save the mother's life.

Madagascar 
Abortion was prohibited in Madagascar and only allowed to save the mother's life.

Grenada 
There is no information about the abortion status under the short-lived Grenada socialist government. The current legislation allows abortion to preserve the mother's health.

Other Communist areas

Democratic Federation of Northern Syria 
Although Syria only allows abortion to save a mother's life, the de facto autonomous region of the DFNS legalizes abortion for all women. Barbara Anna, a member of the Turkish Communist Party, reflected more broadly on how limits to women's bodily autonomy relate to the imposition of capitalism and imperialism. She compared the situations in the Middle East where women's economic activity and sexual freedom is heavily restricted to the situation in the neoliberal capitalist centre, where women's sexual freedom comes at the expense of constant objectification and commodification.

Revolutionary Armed Forces of Colombia  
The Revolutionary Armed Forces of Colombia supported abortion, despite the laws of Colombia only allowing it in cases of rape, fetal defects, or a need to preserve the mother's health.

Paris Commune 
Article XII states that: "The submission of the children and the mother to the authority of the father, who prepares the submission of each one to the authority of the chief, is pronounced dead. The couple consents freely to seek common pleasure. The Commune proclaims freedom of birth: the right to sexual information from childhood, the right to abortion, the right to contraception. As the products cease to be the property of their parents. They live together in their home and run their own lives." This was in sharp contrast to the French law at the time, which prohibited abortion.

References

Abortion law
Communism
Marxist feminism